The Bamboesberg is a mountain range in the Eastern Cape, South Africa. This range was named for the bamboo Thamnocalamus tessellatus growing in its ravines.

The Bamboesberg is an outlier of the Stormberg Mountains and part of the range is seen parallel to and east of the road linking Hofmeyr and Tarkastad. The Stormbergspruit is a tributary of the Orange River.

The rocks are composed of sediments of the Stormberg Series of the Karoo System.

See also
 List of mountain ranges of South Africa

References

Mountain ranges of the Eastern Cape